Jeronim may refer to:

 Jeronim, South Slavic and Albanian masculine given name
 Jeronim de Rada, Italo-Albanian writer
 Jeronim Ljubibratić, Ragusan military officer
 Jeronim Mileta, Croatian cleric
 Jeronim Vidulić, Croatian poet
 Jeronim, Slovenia, a village near Vransko

See also
 Hieronymus
 Jere (name)
 Jerolim (disambiguation)
 Jerome

Croatian masculine given names